Julen is a given name. Notable people with the name include:

Given name 
 Julen Aguinagalde (born 1982), Spanish handballer
 Julen Goikoetxea (1985–2006), Basque cyclist from Ondarroa
 Julen Guerrero (born 1974), retired Spanish footballer
 Julen Guimón (1931–2001), Spanish jurist and politician
 Julen Lopetegui (born 1966), retired Spanish footballer and current manager
 Julen Madariaga (1932–2021), Basque Spanish politician and lawyer, co-founder of ETA
 Julen Isaakovych Uralov (born 1924), Soviet Olympic fencer
 Julen Urigüen (born 1991), junior tennis player in the United States
 Julen Roselló, a child who fell down a hole in 2019

Surname 
 Alfons Julen (1899–1988), Swiss cross-country skier
 Anton Julen (1898–1982), Swiss cross-country
 Martin Julen (born 1928), Swiss alpine skier
 Max Julen (born 1961), Swiss alpine skier

See also
 Lat julen foerkunna, song written by John Lennon and Yoko Ono
 Julana
 Julian (disambiguation)
 Julienne (disambiguation)
 Jullian
 Jullien
 Zuilen